Emigrant Creek is a stream in the U.S. state of Oregon. It is a tributary to Bear Creek.

Emigrant Creek was named in 1846 by a party of emigrants which crossed over it.

References

Rivers of Oregon
Rivers of Jackson County, Oregon